The men's javelin throw at the 2022 World Athletics Championships was held at the Hayward Field in Eugene on 21 and 23 July 2022.

Records
Before the competition records were as follows:

Qualification standard
The standard to qualify automatically for entry was 85.00 m.

Schedule
The event schedule, in local time (UTC−7), was as follows:

Results

Qualification
Qualification: Automatic qualifying mark 83.50 (Q) or at least best 12 qualify to Final (q) advanced to the final.

Final

References

Javelin throw
Javelin throw at the World Athletics Championships